The Net may refer to:

Film
 The Net (1916 film), a film by George Foster Platt
 The Net (1923 film), a film by J. Gordon Edwards
 The Net (1953 film), a film starring James Donald
 The Net (1975 film), a film starring Klaus Kinski
 The Net (1995 film), a film starring Sandra Bullock
 Das Netz or The Net, a 2003 independent film by Lutz Dammbeck
 The Net (2016 film), a South Korean film by Kim Ki-duk

Television
 The Net (British TV series), a 1994 educational show focusing on emerging technologies
 The Net (American TV series), a 1998 drama series based on the 1995 film

Other uses
The Net (novel), a 1952 novel by John Pudney
 The Net (album), a 1983 album by the Little River Band
 The Net (substance), an alloy of copper and antimony
 The Net (building), a future high-rise building in Seattle, Washington, U.S.
 Internet or the Net
 Network Associates Coliseum or the Net, now Oakland–Alameda County Coliseum, a multi-purpose stadium in California

See also 
 Net (disambiguation)
 NET (disambiguation)
 NETS (disambiguation)
 .net (disambiguation)